James Edward Ryan is an American legal scholar and lawyer, currently serving as the 9th president of the University of Virginia since August 2018. He previously served as the 11th dean of the Harvard Graduate School of Education from 2013 to 2018. 

Ryan is also the author of Wait, What?: And Life's Other Essential Questions and Five Miles Away, A World Apart: One City, Two Schools, and the Story of Educational Opportunity in Modern America. On September 15, 2017, it was announced that he would replace Teresa Sullivan as the ninth President of the University of Virginia. 

His first act upon his inauguration on October 19, 2018, was to announce that in-state undergraduates from families making less than $30,000 per year would receive scholarships covering tuition, room, and board; and that in-state undergraduates from families making less than $80,000 per year would receive full scholarships covering tuition. Starting in fall 2020, in response to the COVID-19 pandemic, he enacted strict restrictions on students.

Biography 
Raised in Midland Park, New Jersey, Ryan attended the local public schools.

Prior to serving as dean of Harvard Graduate School of Education, Ryan was the Matheson and Morgenthau Distinguished Professor of Law and Weber Research Professor of Civil Liberties and Human Rights at the University of Virginia School of Law. He graduated from Yale University and University of Virginia School of Law where he graduated Omicron Delta Kappa, and clerked for then-chief judge of the 9th Circuit J. Clifford Wallace and then-Supreme Court Chief Justice William Rehnquist. 

Ryan lives with his family in Charlottesville, Virginia. Prior to accepting the UVA presidency, Ryan lived in Lincoln, Massachusetts with his wife, four children, and various animals including two cats, two dogs, and nine chickens.

See also 
 List of law clerks of the Supreme Court of the United States (Chief Justice)

References

External links 
 Harvard Graduate School of Education biography

American lawyers
Harvard University faculty
Living people
People from Midland Park, New Jersey
University of Virginia School of Law alumni
University of Virginia School of Law faculty
Presidents of the University of Virginia
Year of birth missing (living people)